"Lucille" is a 1957 rock and roll song originally recorded by American musician Little Richard. Released on Specialty Records in February 1957, the single reached number 1 on the Billboard R&B chart, 21 on the US pop chart, and number 10 on the UK chart. It was composed by Albert Collins (not to be confused with the blues guitarist of the same name) and Little Richard. First pressings of Specialty 78rpm credit Collins as the sole writer. Little Richard bought half of the song's rights while Collins was in Louisiana State Penitentiary.

The song foreshadowed the rhythmic feel of 1960s rock music in several ways, including its heavy bassline and slower tempo, inspired by the chugging of a train the band had been riding. The scene-setting sections also feature stop-time breaks and no change in harmony, and it has a darker sound because most of the instruments use a low register.

Recording
Little Richard sang and played piano on his recording, backed by a band consisting of Lee Allen (tenor saxophone), Alvin "Red" Tyler (baritone sax), Roy Montrell (guitar), Frank Fields (bass), and Earl Palmer (drums).

Legacy
In 2002, "Lucille" was inducted into the Grammy Hall of Fame. Music critic and writer Dave Marsh included the song on his list of The 1001 Greatest Singles Ever Made at number 670.

Other recordings
Little Richard re-recorded "Lucille", like many of his other hits, multiple times throughout his career. The first substantially different version of the song was recorded in 1964 and appeared on Little Richard's Greatest Hits. His last recording appears on the 1992 album Little Richard Meets Masayoshi Takanaka.

In 1994, Little Richard appeared on the television series Sesame Street performing a rewritten version of "Lucille" entitled "Rosita", about the Muppet character of the same name.

Cover versions
In 1960 The Everly Brothers recorded it, peaking at number 21 on the Hot 100.
The Hollies, in 1963. 
On September 3, 1963, the Beatles recorded "Lucille" for the BBC's Pop Go the Beatles #14 (aired September 17, 1963). They recorded a second rendition on September 7, 1963, for Saturday Club's 5th Birthday Edition (aired October 5, 1963), and after their break-up, John Lennon and Paul McCartney recorded it on a bootleg called A Toot And a Snore in '74. At the closing day on December 29, 1979 of the Concerts for the People of Kampuchea, the supergroup Rockestra, with Paul McCartney, performed the song. In 1987 McCartney rerecorded it for his oldies album called CHOBA B CCCP which was released in Russia in 1988, and in the rest of the world in 1991.
Ralph Williams/The Marauders, in 1964 on Decca Records.
Deep Purple frequently performed "Lucille" as an encore during the 1970s and 1980s. One performance is included as a bonus track on the 1998 reissue of their album Made in Japan. In 1984, during their tour in Australia, George Harrison joined Deep Purple on stage to perform the song.
In 1977, Queen performed it on two nights in Earl's Court.
Notably, The Doors performed "Lucille" as the closing track of their London Fog 1966 performance, which was released as a recording in 2016 and is believed to be their first recorded live performance.
In 1977, Queen performed it on two nights in Earl's Court.
In 1983, Waylon Jennings recorded his take on "Lucille".  Released as a single, it became Jennings' twelfth number 1 on the country chart. In Canada, it reached number 4.

References

1957 singles
1983 singles
1957 songs
Little Richard songs
The Beatles songs
Waylon Jennings songs
Grammy Hall of Fame Award recipients
RCA Records singles
London Records singles
Songs written by Little Richard
Specialty Records singles